Dendrobium delacourii  is a member of the family Orchidaceae. It is native to Thailand, Vietnam, Laos and Myanmar.

Description
Dendrobium delacourii is a miniature sized epiphyte. It has elliptical clumping pseudobulbs that each carry 2-4 deciduous leaves. Flowers have a prominent fringed labellum.

References

delacourii
Epiphytic orchids
Flora of Indo-China